Hull is a city in Sioux County, Iowa. The population was 2,384 at the time of the 2020 census.

History
The first settlers in the Hull area arrived in 1872. The city was incorporated on May 15, 1886. Hull was named for John A. T. Hull, a member of the United States House of Representatives from Iowa. It was previously named Pattersonville for John G. Patterson, before changing its name to Winland then finally Hull in the 1880s.

In 1993, The Foreign Candy Company of Hull became the first American firm to import Warheads (candy). 

In 2004, Hull received a $400,000 grant from Vision Iowa to build the Pattersonville Park and Cultural Center. Some of the money was returned in 2011 because the park had not been constructed.

Geography
Hull is located at  (43.190203, -96.134390).

Demographics

2010 census
As of the census of 2010, 2,175 people, 741 households, and 577 families resided in the city. The 764 housing units averaged . The racial makeup of the city was 92.6% White, 0.4% African American, 0.6% Native American, 0.7% Asian, 5.1% from other races, and 0.7% from two or more races. Hispanics or Latinos of any race were 9.1% of the population.

Of the 741 households, 38.9% had children under the age of 18 living with them, 71.7% were married couples living together, 3.5% had a female householder with no husband present, 2.7% had a male householder with no wife present, and 22.1% were not families. About 20.1% of all households were made up of individuals, and 8.4% had someone living alone who was 65 years of age or older. The average household size was 2.85 and the average family size was 3.30.

The median age in the city was 32.5 years; 30.5% of residents were under the age of 18; 8.5% were between the ages of 18 and 24; 25% were from 25 to 44; 20.3% were from 45 to 64; and 15.6% were 65 years of age or older. The gender makeup of the city was 49.8% male and 50.2% female.

2000 census
As of the census of 2000, there were 1,960 people, 682 households, and 527 families residing in the city. The racial makeup of the city was 94.34% White, 0.05% African American, 1.12% Asian, 3.78% from other races, and 0.71% from two or more races. Hispanic or Latino of any race were 6.28% of the population.

There were 682 households, out of which 40.0% had children under the age of 18 living with them, 72.7% were married couples living together, 2.9% had a female householder with no husband present, and 22.7% were non-families. 21.3% of all households were made up of individuals, and 13.9% had someone living alone who was 65 years of age or older. The average household size was 2.80 and the average family size was 3.30.

In the city, the population was spread out, with 30.7% under the age of 18, 8.5% from 18 to 24, 24.5% from 25 to 44, 17.9% from 45 to 64, and 18.4% who were 65 years of age or older. The median age was 34 years. For every 100 females, there were 95.4 males. For every 100 females age 18 and over, there were 90.5 males.

The median income for a household in the city was $38,269, and the median income for a family was $43,919. Males had a median income of $31,100 versus $17,991 for females. The per capita income for the city was $16,153. About 6.1% of families and 8.2% of the population were below the poverty line, including 10.5% of those under age 18 and 10.5% of those age 65 or over.

Education 
Boyden–Hull Community School District includes Hull in its boundary, and operates Boyden-Hull Elementary School in Boyden, and Boyden–Hull Junior/High School in Hull; the latter houses the district's headquarters.

Area private schools:
Hull Christian School 
Hull Protestant Reformed Christian School
Trinity Christian High School
Western Christian High School

Economy

Agriculture
Located in Northwest Iowa, much of Hull's economy is centered around the agricultural industry, either directly or indirectly. Agropur Cooperative is located in Hull and is the largest employer. The Foreign Candy Company, distributors of Warheads sour candy and other sweets, was started in Hull in 1978. The Pizza Ranch restaurant chain was founded in Hull in 1981. A Subway opened in February 2013. The Hull Co-op Society provides a number of agricultural services to Hull and surrounding areas, including a grain elevator, feed mill, and custom spraying. Other businesses include Hull Feed and Produce which provides feed mill services, and Hull Veterinary Clinic.

Finance
Two banks have branches in Hull: Iowa State Bank and American State Bank. Iowa State Bank started as Baumann Brothers Bank in 1879. Ten years later, it was renamed Iowa State Bank. It closed for a short period during the Great Depression and was reopened in 1934. American State Bank moved to Hull in 2004, and constructed a new building in 2007. It also has branches in Alvord, Granville, Hospers, and Sioux Center. It is the largest bank in Sioux County. In 2019, The Kelley Group Co purchased Koele Inc (dba Koele Insurance).

Notable people
 Dwayne Alons, member of the Iowa State House of Representatives
 Randy Feenstra, member of the Iowa Senate and United States House of Representatives
 Nancy Metcalf, American indoor volleyball player
 Wilmon Newell, entomologist
 William Earl Rowe, 20th lieutenant governor of Ontario, Canada
 Alexander Grant Ruthven, president of the University of Michigan from 1929–1951.

References

External links
 Official City Website
City Data

 
Cities in Iowa
Cities in Sioux County, Iowa
Populated places established in 1886
1886 establishments in Iowa